Steven Leroy DeBerg (born January 19, 1954) is an American former professional football player who was a quarterback in the National Football League (NFL) for 17 years.

Early life
DeBerg is an alumnus of Savanna High School in Anaheim, California. He was the starting quarterback, and excelled in the pole vault.

He was the starting quarterback at Fullerton College during the 1972 and 1973 seasons. As a sophomore in 1973, DeBerg led his team to a South Coast Conference title with a 5–0 record. In the postseason, Fullerton defeated San Diego City College 24–0 but lost 29–20 to Los Angeles City College in the state semifinals. DeBerg ended the season with an overall record of 10–1–0, and received Junior College All-American honors.

He transferred to San José State University in 1974, and became the Spartans' starting quarterback in 1976. DeBerg led his team to a Pacific Coast Athletic Association (Big West Conference) title, and was named the PCAA offensive player of the year. He set nine school records, completing 141 of 262 attempts for 2,084 yards, 19 touchdowns, and six interceptions.

In 1993, DeBerg was inducted into the California Community College's Football Coaches Association Hall of Fame. Eight years later, he was inducted into the San Jose State University Ring of Honor and Sports Hall of Fame.

Professional playing career
Although large portions of his professional career were spent as a backup, DeBerg accumulated significant NFL statistics (particularly during the early 1990s, when he was the starting quarterback for the Kansas City Chiefs). DeBerg played for the San Francisco 49ers (1978–1980), Denver Broncos (1981–1983), Tampa Bay Buccaneers (1984–1987, 1992, 1993), Kansas City Chiefs (1988–1991), Miami Dolphins (1993), and Atlanta Falcons (1998). He was selected by the Dallas Cowboys in the tenth round (275th overall) of the 1977 NFL draft, but was waived before the start of the season when he could not displace fellow rookie quarterback Glenn Carano.

DeBerg has been called one of the best play-action pass quarterbacks of all time. Peyton Manning has studied films of DeBerg's play-action technique. He played through injuries; ill with laryngitis, he wore a portable amplifier during regular-season games with San Francisco.

1977–1980: San Francisco 49ers
On September 14, 1977, DeBerg was signed to the San Francisco 49ers' taxi squad. The starter in 1978, he was the first quarterback to implement Bill Walsh's West Coast Offense the following year. When Walsh drafted Joe Montana from Notre Dame in the third round of the 1979 NFL draft, DeBerg was relegated to a backup role midway through the 1980 season.

In 1979, his only full season as a starter in San Francisco, DeBerg led the NFL in completions (347) and pass attempts (578). He ranked fifth in the league in passing yards (3,652), throwing 17 touchdowns against 21 interceptions. DeBerg had his first 300-yard passing game in his sixth start against Seattle, completing a season-high 31 of 40 passes for 306 yards with one touchdown and one interception. Later that year, he posted his first 100.0 passer rating as a starter (one of two 49ers' wins all year) against the Tampa Bay Buccaneers. DeBerg finished the game with 22 completions in 30 pass attempts (a season-high 73.3-percent completion rate), with one touchdown and no interceptions.

The 49ers improved in 1980, winning six games (four started by DeBerg). He completed 186 of 321 passes for 1,998 yards, with 12 touchdowns and 17 interceptions. DeBerg started the season well, winning his first three starts and twice completing over 70 percent of his pass attempts. Turnovers became an issue, however, as the team began struggling. The low point was a five-interception game in a lopsided loss to Dallas on October 12.

1981–1983: Denver Broncos
DeBerg was traded to the Denver Broncos on August 31, 1981 for a 1983 fourth-round draft pick (#87, Chuck Nelson), rejoining Dan Reeves (who coached him during his short time with the Cowboys). Similar events unfolded several times over the next decade. After being with the 49ers when they drafted Joe Montana in the third round in 1979, DeBerg was with the Broncos when John Elway joined as the result of a trade. Elway was drafted first overall in 1983, but refused to sign with the Baltimore Colts.

During his three seasons in Denver, DeBerg backed up Craig Morton and Elway and appeared in 33 games with 11 starts. He was 4–1 as a starter for the 1983 Broncos, subbing for the rookie Elway and helping to lead the team to the postseason.

1984–1987: Tampa Bay Buccaneers
On April 24, 1984, DeBerg was traded to the Tampa Bay Buccaneers for a fourth-round pick (#89, Randy Robbins) and a 1985 conditional pick who ended up being a second-round selection (#36, Richard Byrd). He arrived at the club when Steve Young and Vinny Testaverde (1987) were drafted.

DeBerg was the central starter for the 1984 Buccaneers, who posted one of the league's more productive offensive attacks when he was the starting quarterback. The 1984 Bucs ranked 10th in the league in total offensive yards, and eighth in passing yards. DeBerg appeared in all 16 games, starting 13 and winning five of the team's six victories that year. He passed for 3,554 yards (the second-best of his career), with 308 completions in 509 attempts (both the second-best of his career) and 19 touchdowns against 18 interceptions.

He finished high on the NFL leaderboards for the 1984 season in attempts (fourth), completions (fourth), passing yards (seventh), touchdown passes (ninth) and passing yards per game (eighth). The Bucs earned their first win of the season with DeBerg coming off the bench, a 21–17 victory against Detroit on September 16 in which he completed 18 of 27 passes (66.7 percent) for 195 yards with two touchdowns and no interceptions. It was one of four games that season in which DeBerg's quarterback rating topped 100; the other three were October 7 against Minnesota, October 14 against Detroit, and December 16 against the New York Jets.

DeBerg never passed for fewer than 191 yards in any start that year, and topped the 200-yard mark ten times. His season-high 322 passing yards came on November 25, 1984 in a 34–33 shootout loss to the Los Angeles Rams.

Narrow losses became the norm, as six of the team's eight losses with DeBerg were by seven points or less. Tampa's won-lost record regressed the following year, but DeBerg started 11 games and played in all 16. He ranked 10th in the league in touchdown passes, completing 197 of 370 passes for 2,488 yards with 19 touchdowns and 18 interceptions.

After starting only two games in 1986, DeBerg was again Tampa's leading passer in his final season there in 1987. Appearing in 12 games (with eight starts), he completed 159 of 275 passes for 1,891 yards with 14 touchdowns and seven interceptions—his lowest mark up to this point in a season in which he started at least six games. DeBerg finished eighth in the league in QB rating (85.8), his first season in the year-end top 10 for that category.

He also finished in the league's top 10 in completion rate (57.8 percent), one of six seasons in the year-end top 10 in that category (1979, 1982, 1984, 1987, 1989, 1990). DeBerg made a career-high five touchdown passes in an opening-day win against Atlanta on September 13, 1987, a game in which he completed 24 of 34 pass attempts (a season-high 70.4-percent completion rate) for 333 yards.

1988–1991: Kansas City Chiefs
On March 31, 1988, The Buccaneers traded him to the Kansas City Chiefs for safety Mark Robinson and fourth- (#86, John Bruhin) and eighth-round picks (#198, Anthony Simpson). Although he is remembered as a journeyman quarterback, DeBerg passed for over 34,000 career yards and ranks in the all-time top 20 in attempts, completions, and yards passed. His best years were with the Chiefs, when he led the team to two playoff berths. DeBerg's best year was 1990, when he had a 96.3 quarterback rating and passed for 3,444 yards, 23 touchdowns, and four interceptions (three of which were in one game).

DeBerg appeared in 13 games with 11 starts and passed for 2,935 yards with 16 touchdowns and 16 interceptions in his first season with the Chiefs, completing 224 of 414 passes. He defeated his old team (Denver) on September 18, 1988 in one of his better games of the year, throwing 259 yards and two touchdowns with no interceptions. DeBerg's best game was against the New York Jets on December 4, 1988, when he completed 16 of 25 passes for 267 yards and three touchdowns against one interception for a 38–34 win.

Turnover issues again temporarily cost him his starting job in 1989. DeBerg threw eight interceptions in the team's first three games, including five in one game (against the San Diego Chargers) on September 24. After sitting for two weeks, he briefly returned to the playing field; he then sat for two more weeks before finishing the season by starting the team's final six games. Among DeBerg's highlights was a 338-yard, one-touchdown, two-interception performance against the Pittsburgh Steelers in a 23–17 loss on October 29. He finished the 1989 season with 2,529 yards passing, completing 196 of 324 passes (a 60.5-percent completion rate), with 11 touchdowns against 16 interceptions.

The 1990 season was DeBerg's best. His 3,444 yards were his third-best single-season career total, and seventh in the league. DeBerg's 96.3 passer rating was a career high (and third in the league), and he finished in the top 10 for yards per attempt (7.8, fourth in the league and his second straight season in the category's top five). He was eighth in the league in passing yards per game and fifth in the league in yards per completion; his previous best was ninth in 1988. DeBerg's 23 touchdown passes ranked sixth, one of his four top-ten seasons. He led the league with a 0.9 interception percentage which included a career-high (and team-record) 223 passes without an interception, one of his three top-ten seasons; the other two were 1979 and 1987.

DeBerg posted a career-high 395 yards passing against Denver on September 17, 1990. He seriously injured his non-throwing hand in a loss to the Houston Oilers on December 16, which required the insertion of a pin into his broken finger to keep it straight. For their last two games and the playoffs, the Chiefs ran their offense out of the shotgun formation to protect DeBerg from having the football jammed in his injured hand during the center-to-quarterback exchange. Kansas City won those games to clinch their second playoff appearance in over a decade, with DeBerg completing 44 of 59 passes for 527 yards with two touchdowns and no interceptions. In a 17–16 loss to the Miami Dolphins in the 1990 AFC wild-card game, he completed 17 of 30 pass attempts for 269 yards with one touchdown and one interception.

1992–1993: Second stint with Tampa Bay and Miami Dolphins
DeBerg rejoined the Buccaneers and played with them in 1992 Tampa Bay Buccaneers. In 1993, after three games with Tampa Bay, the Buccaneers cut DeBerg leading him to believe his career was over. Shortly after, however, the Miami Dolphins signed him. During the season, he left a Dolphins game against the New York Giants bleeding from a helmet blow to the chin, but returned to the game after halftime. Earlier in the season, DeBerg started in place of Dan Marino in the Thanksgiving game where Leon Lett's blunder resulted in a Dolphins win. He retired after the 1993 season.

1998: Atlanta Falcons and second retirement
On October 25, with Chris Chandler unable to play, Deberg became the third-oldest quarterback to play in an NFL game when he led the Falcons against the New York Jets. In a 28–3 Falcons loss, DeBerg threw 9 of 20 for 117 yards and an interception before he was taken out for Tony Graziani. DeBerg was the oldest player on a Super Bowl roster (45 years, 12 days) when the Falcons appeared in Super Bowl XXXIII, although he did not play.

On February 5, 2010, DeBerg was inducted into the Rebel Hall of Fame at Savanna High School for his achievements as a starting quarterback in college and the NFL. The induction was held during halftime at a varsity boys basketball game at Savanna High School.

Coaching career
From 1995 to 1996, DeBerg was the New York Giants' quarterbacks coach under Dan Reeves.

DeBerg was head coach of the Arena Football League's Indiana Firebirds in 2004 for five games; the team's record during his tenure was 0–5. He was later an assistant coach for the Tampa Bay Storm.

Personal life
On August 17, 1974, DeBerg married Marcia North. They had two children, and divorced in 1996.

References

External links
Steve DeBerg coaching page at ArenaFan Online

Sports Reference – collegiate statistics – Steve DeBerg

Players of American football from Oakland, California
American football quarterbacks
San Francisco 49ers players
Denver Broncos players
Tampa Bay Buccaneers players
Kansas City Chiefs players
Miami Dolphins players
Atlanta Falcons players
San Jose State Spartans football players
Indiana Firebirds coaches
1954 births
Living people
Sportspeople from Orange County, California
Track and field athletes from Oakland, California
Fullerton Hornets football players
Tampa Bay Storm coaches
New York Giants coaches